Aleksandr Romanovich Nosov (born 6 June 1995) is a Russian football player. He plays for FC Volgar Astrakhan.

Club career
He made his debut in the Russian Football National League for FC Salyut Belgorod on 19 November 2012 in a game against FC Neftekhimik Nizhnekamsk.

References

External links
 
 

1995 births
People from Belgorod
Sportspeople from Belgorod Oblast
Living people
Russian footballers
Association football midfielders
Association football forwards
Russia youth international footballers
FC Salyut Belgorod players
FC Avangard Kursk players
FC Luch Vladivostok players
FC Nizhny Novgorod (2015) players
FC Shinnik Yaroslavl players
FC SKA-Khabarovsk players
FC Volgar Astrakhan players
Russian First League players
Russian Second League players